The Conservative Party (German: Konservative Partei) was a political party in Prussia which was founded in 1848 by the relatively loose cooperation of conservative associations, groups and members of parliament.

The party split into the German Conservative Party and the Free Conservative Party in 1876.

Chairmen 

 Ernst Ludwig von Gerlach

Electoral results

German Reichstag/Bundestag

References 

Defunct political parties in Germany
Political parties established in 1848
Politics of the German Empire
1876 disestablishments in Germany
Political parties disestablished in 1876
Defunct conservative parties
Politics of Prussia